Charles Michael Romes (born December 16, 1954 in Verdun, France) was an American football cornerback in the NFL, primarily for the Buffalo Bills. He played college football at North Carolina Central University. Romes's 137 total starts with Buffalo are 8th-most in team history. He is distinguished as being the first French man to play in the National Football League.

Professional career
Romes played for the Bills for a total of ten seasons, playing in every game for the Bills from his rookie season to 1986, starting every game from 1978 forward. Romes logged at least one interception in every year from 1978 to 1986; his 28 career interceptions are fourth in team history. In Week Two of his second season, Romes returned an interception 85 yards for a touchdown against the New York Jets.

Romes played five games with the San Diego Chargers in 1987.

References
Charles Romes at Pro-Football-Reference

1954 births
People from Verdun
American football cornerbacks
Buffalo Bills players
San Diego Chargers players
North Carolina Central Eagles football players
French players of American football
Living people
Sportspeople from Meuse (department)